Witching may refer to:

 The practice of witchcraft
 Dowsing, a practice that attempts to locate objects without the use of scientific apparatus
 The Witching, a comic book series
 Triple witching, an economic concept
 Witching Waves, an amusement ride introduced in 1907

See also
 Witching hour (disambiguation)